The 1882 Detroit Wolverines finished the season with a 42–41 record, good for fifth place in the National League.

During the season, Detroit owner William G. Thompson had a private investigator look into umpire Richard Higham, after suspicions of matchfixing, which resulted in Higham becoming the only umpire to be banned in MLB history.

Regular season

Season standings

Record vs. opponents

Roster

Player stats

Batting

Starters by position
Note: Pos = Position; G = Games played; AB = At bats; H = Hits; Avg. = Batting average; HR = Home runs; RBI = Runs batted in

Other batters
Note: G = Games played; AB = At bats; H = Hits; Avg. = Batting average; HR = Home runs; RBI = Runs batted in

Pitching

Starting pitchers
Note: G = Games pitched; IP = Innings pitched; W = Wins; L = Losses; ERA = Earned run average; SO = Strikeouts

Other pitchers
Note: G = Games pitched; IP = Innings pitched; W = Wins; L = Losses; ERA = Earned run average; SO = Strikeouts

Relief pitchers
Note: G = Games pitched; W = Wins; L = Losses; SV = Saves; ERA = Earned run average; SO = Strikeouts

References
1882 Detroit Wolverines season at Baseball Reference

Detroit Wolverines seasons
Detroit Wolverines season
Detroit Wolv
1880s in Detroit